The Westlake City School District is a public school district that serves Westlake, Ohio.

Schools
Westlake High School
Lee Burneson Middle School
Dover Intermediate School
Westlake Elementary School

References

External links

School districts in Cuyahoga County, Ohio